Norfolk Air was an airline based on Norfolk Island, an external territory of Australia.  It was owned by the Administration of Norfolk Island, with flights operated by Our Airline.

The airline provided services between Norfolk Island Airport and Sydney, Brisbane, Newcastle and Melbourne. As Norfolk Island was outside of the Australian migration zone, flights were required to depart from international terminals at each airport and passengers were required to carry a document of identity or passport.

History
The airline began operations in May 2006, initially operating services between Norfolk Island and Brisbane and Sydney, with flights subsequently added on a weekly basis from Newcastle in May 2007 and from Melbourne in November 2007. All services were operated by OzJet until May 2009 when Our Airline commenced flying on Norfolk Air's behalf using B737-300 aircraft. One of Our Airline's B737-300 was painted in Norfolk Air's livery. Our Airline provided the aircraft and technical crew for the operations, while Norfolk Air provided the cabin crew, with all cabin crew being residents of Norfolk Island.

In April 2009 OzJet announced its decision to terminate charter services on behalf of Norfolk Air with immediate effect. Subsequently, it was announced by Norfolk Air that Our Airline would begin operating all Norfolk Air services ahead of the already changeover planned for May 2009.

On 24 December 2011 the Norfolk Island Government decided to withdraw services, with the final flight operating on 26 February 2012. Air New Zealand took over services between the Australian mainland and Norfolk Island on 6 March 2012, operating from Sydney and Brisbane using Airbus A320 aircraft.

Destinations 
Norfolk Air operated from its base at Norfolk Island Airport to Brisbane, Melbourne, Newcastle and Sydney.

Fleet 

As of May 2009, the Norfolk Air fleet included:

See also
 List of defunct airlines of Australia
 Aviation in Australia

References 

Norfolk Air withdrawal.

External links

Norfolk Air

Defunct airlines of Norfolk Island
Aviation in Norfolk Island
Government-owned airlines
Airlines disestablished in 2012
Airlines established in 2006
2006 establishments in Australia
2012 disestablishments in Australia